Kaminskas (Kaminskienė, Kaminskaitė) is a Lithuanian language family name. It corresponds to Polish surname Kamiński. (The English/German plural form of the latter, as in Diese Kaminskis should not be confused with the Lithuanian surname).

The surname may refer to:
 Juozas Kaminskas  (1898–1957), Lithuanian painter
 Rim Kaminskas, American aircraft designer, creator of Kaminskas Jungster I and Jungster II
 Birutė Berčiūnaitė-Kaminskienė, Lithuanian Righteous Among the Nations
 Eleonora Kaminskaitė (1951–1986), Lithuanian rower
 Kazys Algirdas Kaminskas  (1940-), Lithuanian researcher in the field of ergonomics 

Lithuanian-language surnames